Excel High School may refer to one of the following:

Excel High School (Alabama), a public high school in the town of Excel, Alabama
EXCEL High School, a former public high school in Oakland, California